Kepler-9 is a sunlike star in the constellation Lyra. Its planetary system, discovered by the Kepler Mission in 2010 was the first detected with the transit method found to contain multiple planets.

Nomenclature and history
Kepler-9 was named for the Kepler Mission, a project headed by NASA that was designed to search for Earth-like planets.

In June 2010, some 43 days after Kepler came online, its operating scientists submitted a list of over 700 exoplanet candidates for review. Of those, five were originally suspected to have more than one planet. Kepler-9 was one of the multiplanetary systems; it was identified as such when scientists noticed significant variations in the time intervals at which Kepler-9 was transited. Kepler-9 holds the first multiplanetary system discovered using the transit method. It is also the first planetary system where transiting planets were confirmed through transit timing variations method, allowing to calculate the masses of planets. The discovery of the planets was announced on August 26, 2010.

Characteristics
Kepler-9 is located in the constellation Lyra that lies some 620 parsecs away from Earth. Kepler-9 has an effective temperature of 5777 (± 61) K, as compared to the Sun's at 5778 K, and is approximately 32% more metal-rich (in terms of iron) than the Sun. Kepler-9 is younger than the Sun, and is estimated to be one billion years old.

Planetary system

There are three confirmed planets, all in direct orbit. The outer two planets, Kepler-9b (the inner one) and Kepler-9c (the outer one), are low-density gas giants that are respectively 25% and 17% the mass of Jupiter and around 80% the radius of Jupiter. Both planets have a density less than that of water, similar to Saturn. The innermost planet, Kepler-9d, is a super-Earth with a radius that is 1.64 times that of Earth, orbiting the star every 1.6 days. It is estimated that there is a 0.59% chance that the discoveries are false.

From Kepler-9d (closest to star) to Kepler-9b (second from star), the ratio of their orbits is 1:12. However, the ratio of the orbits of the two outer planets is 1:2,  a relationship known as a mean motion resonance. Kepler-9b and Kepler-9c are the first transiting planets detected in such an orbital configuration. The resonance causes the orbital speeds of each planet to change, and thus causes the transit times of the two planets to oscillate. The period of Kepler-9b is increasing by 4 minutes per orbit, while that of Kepler-9c is decreasing by 39 minutes per orbit. These orbital changes allowed the masses of the planets (a parameter not normally obtainable via the transit method) to be estimated using a dynamical model. The mass estimates were further refined using radial velocity measurements obtained with the HIRES instrument of the Keck 1 telescope.

Kepler-9b and 9c are thought to have formed beyond the "frost line". They are then thought to have migrated inward due to interactions with the remains of the protoplanetary disk. They would have been captured into orbital resonance during this migration.

In 2021, it was found the orbital plane of Kepler-9b and Kepler-9c are slowly changing, likely under the gravitational influence of the additional giant planet.

See also
 List of extrasolar planets
 Kepler Mission

References

External links
 Keith Cooper (26 August 2010). "Kepler finds first double planet transiting system", Astronomy Now. Accessed 7 September 2010.

Planetary systems with three confirmed planets
Lyra (constellation)
9
Planetary transit variables
G-type main-sequence stars